The Daytona Beach Breakers were a Single 'A' professional ice hockey team based in Daytona Beach, Florida.  The team began play as the Sun Devils in the Sunshine Hockey League's first season in 1992–93 and remained with the SuHL until 1995, when the league changed its name to Southern Hockey League.  The team became known as the Breakers while playing in the SHL.  After the 1995–96 season both the team and the league folded.

External links
Team profile on HockeyDB.com

Defunct ice hockey teams in the United States
Ice hockey teams in Florida
Daytona Beach, Florida
Sunshine Hockey League teams
Southern Hockey League (1995–96) teams